Song for All is an album by Muhal Richard Abrams which was released on the Italian Black Saint label in 1997 and features performances of eight of Abrams' compositions by Abrams, Eddie Allen, Craig Harris, Eugene Ghee, Alfred Patterson, Brad Jones, and Reggie Nicholson.

Reception
The Allmusic review by Scott Yanow calls the album "music that ranges from advanced hard bop (some of the grooves are quite straight-ahead) to some rather spacy explorations... complex yet often surprisingly accessible music... Well worth several listens". The Penguin Guide to Jazz awarded the album 3½ stars stating "the presence of a vibist makes a significant difference to Abrams's own approach. He sounds more concerned with colours and shapes than with the forward momentum of a piece, and it is all to the good".

Track listing
All compositions by Muhal Richard Abrams
 "Song for All" - 6:37
 "Dabadubada" - 8:54
 "Marching With Honor" - 7:35
 "GMBR" - 13:49
 "Over the Same Over" - 19:59
 "Linetime" - 9:10
 "Steamin' up the Road" - 7:14
 "Imagine" - 4:02
Recorded on April 26–29, 1995 at East Side Sound, New York City

Personnel
Muhal Richard Abrams: piano, synthesizer
Eddie Allen: trumpet
Aaron Stewart: tenor saxophone, soprano saxophone
Craig Harris: trombone
Bryan Carrott: vibraphone, percussion
Brad Jones: bass
Reggie Nicholson: drums
Richarda Abrams: voice

References

1997 albums
Muhal Richard Abrams albums
Black Saint/Soul Note albums